Xiahuayuan railway station is a station on the Beijing–Baotou railway station in Xiahuayuan District, Zhangjiakou Hebei.

See also
 List of stations on Jingbao railway

Railway stations in Hebei